Mruk is a Polish surname. Notable people with the surname include:

 Frank Mruk, American architect
 Joseph Mruk (1903–1995), American politician
 Mirosław Mruk (born 1962), Polish rower

See also
 

Polish-language surnames